Lyttelton is a former New Zealand parliamentary electorate. It existed from 1853 to 1890, and again from 1893 to 1996, when it was replaced by the Banks Peninsula electorate.

Population centres
The New Zealand Constitution Act 1852, passed by the British government, allowed New Zealand to establish a representative government. The initial 24 New Zealand electorates were defined by Governor George Grey in March 1853. Lyttelton was one of the initial single-member electorates.

The electorate was in the eastern suburbs of Christchurch, New Zealand, and included the port of Lyttelton.

History
The electorate was created in 1853 and existed until 1890. In the 1890 election, the Akaroa electorate covered the town of Lyttelton. The Lyttelton electorate was re-established for the 1893 election and existed until 1996, the first mixed-member proportional (MMP) election, when it was included in the Banks Peninsula electorate.

The nomination meeting for the first election was held on 15 August 1853 at the Reading Room in Lyttelton. The first election was held two days later on a Wednesday at the Resident Magistrate's Office in Lyttelton, with Charles Simeon as Resident Magistrate acting as the returning officer. The election was contested by Christopher Edward Dampier, the solicitor of the Canterbury Association, and James FitzGerald, who in the previous month had been elected Canterbury's first Superintendent. FitzGerald won the election by 55 votes to 45. FitzGerald represented the electorate until 1857, when he resigned due to ill health.

Crosbie Ward won the resulting by-election in May 1858. Ward was re-elected unopposed on 25 January 1861.

Edward Allen Hargreaves won the 1866 election. He resigned in April 1867. Hargreaves was succeeded by George Macfarlan, who was elected unopposed in a 1 July 1867 by-election. Macfarlan died in office on 9 October 1868.

John Thomas Peacock won the 2 November 1868 by-election. He held the seat until April 1873, when was promoted to the New Zealand Legislative Council (the upper house). He resigned from Parliament on 5 April 1873. The resulting by-election on 19 May 1873 was won by his brother in law, Henry Richard Webb, who beat Hugh Murray-Aynsley.

At the 28 December 1875 general election, the Lyttelton electorate was contested by the same two candidates as the 1873 by-election, but this time, Murray-Aynsley was successful. Murray-Aynsley was defeated by Harry Allwright in the 1879 general election held on 4 September.

John Joyce represented Lyttelton from 1887 to 1890 and from 1893 to 1899. The electorate was held from 1913 by James McCombs for the Social Democrats and then for Labour; he was succeeded by his wife when he died, and then his son when she also died.

The 1925 general election was contested by Melville Lyons and the incumbent, James McCombs. The original count resulted in a tie of 4,900 votes each. The returning officer gave his casting vote to Lyons and declared him elected.  A recount was demanded, and on 3 December 1925, an amended result of 4890 votes for Lyons and 4884 votes for McCombs was determined, with the differences in the counts explained by counting informal votes in a different way. Lyons' election was declared void on 13 March 1926, and the previous holder, McCombs, was restored as the holder of the electorate. The 22nd Parliament had its first sitting on 16 June 1926, hence Lyons had not been sworn in before his election was declared void.

The  had a close result, with McCombs just 32 votes ahead of the United–Reform Coalition candidate, Christchurch civil engineer Frederick Willie Freeman.

The seat has been held by National and Norman Kirk transferred to the safer (for Labour) Sydenham seat in 1969, just as his predecessor Harry Lake transferred to the safer (for National) Fendalton seat in 1960.

Election results
Key

Table footnotes:

Election results

1993 election

1990 election

1987 election

1984 election

1981 election

1978 election

1975 election

1972 election

1969 election

1966 election

1963 election

1960 election

1957 election

1954 election

1951 election

1949 election

1946 election

1943 election

1938 election

1935 election

1935 by-election

1933 by-election

1931 election

1928 election

1925 election

1922 election

1919 election

1914 election

1913 by-election

1911 election

1908 election

1905 election

1902 election

1899 election

1896 election

1893 election

1887 election

1884 election

1881 election

1879 election

1875 election

1873 by-election

1866 election

1853 election

Footnotes

Notes

References

1853 establishments in New Zealand
1996 disestablishments in New Zealand
Historical electorates of New Zealand
Politics of Christchurch
History of Christchurch
Lyttelton, New Zealand
1890 disestablishments in New Zealand
1893 establishments in New Zealand